The Cyclorama Building is an 1884 building in the South End of Boston, Massachusetts that is operated by the Boston Center for the Arts.

History
The Classical Revival style Victorian building was commissioned by Charles F. Willoughby's Boston Cyclorama Company to house the Cyclorama of the Battle of Gettysburg, a 400-by-50 foot cyclorama painting of the Battle of Gettysburg.  It was designed by Charles Amos Cummings and Willard T. Sears.
The central space is a 127'-diameter steel-trussed dome which, when it was built, was the largest dome in the country after that on the United States Capitol building. Visitors entered through the crenelated archway, proceeded along a dark winding passage, and then ascended a winding staircase to an elevated viewing platform. Skylights lit the scene by day, and it was illuminated by a system of 25 arc lamps by night.

In 1889, a new cyclorama painting, Custer's Last Fight, was installed, but by 1890, the fashion for cycloramas had ended, and the new owner of the building, John Gardner (father-in-law of Isabella Stewart Gardner), converted it to a venue for popular entertainment, including a carousel, roller skating, boxing tournaments (including an 1894 fight of John L. Sullivan), horseback riding, bicycling, and so on.

By the 1890s, it had become an industrial space, used by the Albert Champion Company. In 1907, Albert Champion developed the Champion spark plug there.

When the Boston Flower Exchange bought the building in 1923, it added a new entrance and covered central dome with a skylight.  The Flower Exchange occupied the building until 1970.

The Cyclorama was added to the National Register of Historic Places in 1973.

Bunker Hill Cyclorama
Another, competing cyclorama building was built two blocks from the first, and displayed a cyclorama of The Battle of Bunker Hill.

See also
 National Register of Historic Places listings in southern Boston, Massachusetts

References

External links

 Cyclorama info, from the Boston Public Library, with images of 19th-century Battle of Gettysburg paintings by Paul Philippoteaux

19th century in Boston
Buildings and structures in Boston
Commercial buildings completed in 1884
Cultural history of Boston
Cummings and Sears buildings
Cycloramas
Event venues on the National Register of Historic Places in Massachusetts
Historic district contributing properties in Massachusetts
National Register of Historic Places in Boston
Neoclassical architecture in Massachusetts
South End, Boston
Victorian architecture in Massachusetts